The 2014–15 Liga Panameña de Fútbol season (also known as the Liga Cable Onda) was the 26th season of top-flight football in Panama. The season began on 18 July 2014 and was scheduled to end in May 2015. Ten teams competed throughout the entire season.

Teams
Rio Abajo finished in 10th place in the overall table last season and were relegated to the Liga Nacional de Ascenso. Taking their place for this season are the overall champions of last season's Liga Nacional de Ascenso Atlético Chiriquí.

2014 Apertura

Personnel and sponsoring (2014 Apertura)

Managerial changes

During the season

Standings

Results

Semifinals

First leg

Second leg

San Francisco won 2–1 on aggregate.

Sporting San Miguelito 2–2 Tauro on aggregate. Sporting San Miguelito won 4–3 on penalties.

Final

2015 Clausura

Personnel and sponsoring (2015 Clausura)

During the season

Standings

Results

Semifinals

First leg

Second leg

Independiente won 3-2 on aggregate.

Arabe Unido 2–1 won on aggregate.

Final

Top goalscorers

Aggregate table

External links
 https://web.archive.org/web/20181006121704/http://panamafutbol.com/?cat=3&paged=3
 http://lpf.com.pa/w/category/noticas/
 https://int.soccerway.com/national/panama/lpf/20142015/apertura/r26625/

Liga Panameña de Fútbol seasons
1
Pan